Mnesarchella loxoscia  is a species of primitive moth in the family Mnesarchaeidae. It is endemic to New Zealand. and is found in the Northland, Auckland, Coromandel, Waikato, Bay of Plenty, Taranaki, Taupo, Gisborne, Rangitikei, Wellington and the Marlborough Sounds regions. Adults of this species are normally on the wing from December and January but can be on the wing as early as October.

Taxonomy
This species was first described by Edward Meyrick in 1888 and named Mnesarchaea loxoscia. In 1988 J. S. Dugdale synonymised this species with M. fusilella. In 2019 George William Gibbs reviewed the species within the family Mnesarchaeidae. During this review he reinstated this species and placed within the genus Mnesarchella. The male lectotype specimen was collected by Meyrick in Auckland in December and is held at the Natural History Museum, London.

Description

Meyrick described the species as follows:
This species is very similar in appearance to M. fusilella. The distinguishing feature of M. loxoscia are the dark brown scales that are found underneath the head of that species.

Distribution 
This species is endemic to New Zealand. It is found in the Northland, Auckland, Coromandel, Waikato, Bay of Plenty, Taranaki, Taupo, Gisborne, Rangitikei, Wellington and the Marlborough Sounds regions.

Habitat 
M. loxoscia lives in similar habitats to M. fusilella, that is well lit damp forests or moist fern-covered banks, but can occur at altitudes of up to 1100 m.

Behaviour 
The adults of this species are normally on the wing from December and January, however in the South Island this species can be on the wing earlier, from October.

References

Moths described in 1888
Endemic fauna of New Zealand
Moths of New Zealand
Mnesarchaeoidea
Taxa named by Edward Meyrick
Endemic moths of New Zealand